This is a list of birds by flight height.

Birds by flight height 

The black kite can reach an altitude of around 37,000 feet especially during their migratory flight to and from West Africa in the second week of September and the last week of May annually. The black kite extremely high altitude flight can be confirmed during the second week of September from any of the South Western States in Nigeria.

See also 

 Organisms at high altitude
 List of birds by flight speed

References 

 
Flight
Flight heights
Highest flight